Jadera is a genus of true bugs in the soapberry bug subfamily.  Members of this genus are only found in the Americas (from southern Canada through Argentina).

Species
These 19 species belong to the genus Jadera:

 Jadera antica (Walker, 1872) i c g
 Jadera bayardae 
 Jadera choprai Göllner-Scheiding, 1979 c g
 Jadera coturnix (Burmeister, 1835) i c g b
 Jadera decipiens Göllner-Scheiding, 1979 c g
 Jadera diaphona Göllner-Scheiding, 1982 c g
 Jadera golbachi Göllner-Scheiding, 1979 c g
 Jadera haematoloma (Herrich-Schaeffer, 1847) i c g b (red-shouldered bug)
 Jadera harrisi Göllner-Scheiding, 1979 c g
 Jadera hinnulea Göllner-Scheiding, 1979 i c g b
 Jadera obscura (Westwood, 1842) c g
 Jadera parapectoralis Göllner-Scheiding, 1979 c g
 Jadera pectoralis Stal, 1862 c g
 Jadera peruviana Göllner-Scheiding, 1982 c g
 Jadera pyrrholoma Stal, 1870 c g
 Jadera sanguinolenta (Fabricius, 1775) c g
 Jadera schuhi Göllner-Scheiding, 1979 c g
 Jadera silbergliedi Froeschner, 1985 c g
 Jadera similaris Göllner-Scheiding, 1979 c g
Data sources: i = ITIS, c = Catalogue of Life, g = GBIF, b = Bugguide.net

References

External links
Scentless plant bugs, Jadera spp. on the UF / IFAS Featured Creatures Web site

Pentatomomorpha genera
Serinethinae